Autocharis phortalis is a species of moth of the family Crambidae. It was described by Pierre Viette in 1958 and is found on Madagascar.

It has a wingspan of about 16.5–17 mm and the length of the forewings is 8 mm.

Viette placed this moth in a group with:
Autocharis librodalis  (Viette, 1958)
Clupeosoma orientalalis  (Viette, 1954)

References

Odontiinae
Moths described in 1958
Moths of Madagascar
Moths of Africa